Breeze Block is a short-lived British TV series written by Ian Pattison which aired on BBC Choice in 2002.

Synopsis
Ralph Breeze lives with his wife Iris and children Eric, Carol and Billy in the Byker Wall area of Newcastle upon Tyne. Ralph has lost his confidence after being made redundant and feels that he is a "stopped clock". As he tries to overcome his paralysis, his wife Iris flirts with his brother Tommy and Tommy flirts with Billy. Eric works as a window cleaner and Carol works for lecherous fishmonger Mr Shields. Billy, encouraged (and pimped) by Uncle Tommy, starts work as a gigolo but is rather unsuccessful as he falls in love with each of his clients.

Ralph attends assertiveness classes to help him overcome his condition and, although Iris is supportive, his children – particularly Eric – are pretty indifferent to the point of cruelty (all for comic effect).

Cast
Tim Healy – Ralph Breeze
Su Elliot – Iris Breeze
David Nellist – Eric Breeze
Alison Mac – Carol Breeze
Craig Heaney – Billy Breeze
Berwick Kaler – Uncle Tommy
Mark Benton – Mr. Shields
Dale Meeks – Hips
David MacCreedy – Stairmonster
Barry King – singing builder
Alice Wood - Friendly Neighbour (uncredited)

Episodes

Episode 1
Season 1, Episode 1: Angels 
Original Air Date: 4 March 2002 
Ralph has lost his eyes and, on being told by Iris that they are in his head where he left them, he realises that there is not as much to see as there used to be.

Episode 2
Season 1, Episode 2: Higher 
Original Air Date: 11 March 2002 
Billy starts his career as a gigolo. Uncle Tommy introduces him to a neighbour with a shepherd fixation. Soon Billy is wearing a clothing range by One Man and His Dog to please his new lady friend.

Episode 3
Season 1, Episode 3: Saturday, Sinday 
Original Air Date: 18 March 2002 
After a heavy night out, looking for a poke, Eric ends up in a fight. He does not realise until the next morning that he has been stabbed. Ralph is feeling anxious and has thrown off his blanket, which used to be used to calm down the budgie.

Episode 4
Season 1, Episode 4: Kid 
Original Air Date: 25 March 2002

Episode 5
Season 1, Episode 5: Unspeakable 
Original Air Date: 1 April 2002
Ralph gets caught sniffing a labourer's dungarees which were left hanging on a nail. When confessing to his family about his indiscretion, he reminisces about when he was a working man at the Swan Hunter shipyard, coming home every night with "sweat rings the size of dinner plates".

Episode 6
Season 1, Episode 6: Wet 
Original Air Date: 8 April 2002
Ralph gets a job collecting trolleys for a derisory wage. Carol goes on an unsatisfactory date with her old art teacher.

External links 
 

2002 British television series debuts
2002 British television series endings
2000s British comedy television series
BBC television sitcoms
English-language television shows
Television shows set in Tyne and Wear
Television shows set in Newcastle upon Tyne